Launcher may refer to:

 Application launcher, a kind of utility software
 Rocket launcher, a device that launches a rocket-propelled projectile
 Grenade launcher, a weapon that launches a specially-designed grenade
 Launch vehicle, a rocket used to carry a payload from Earth's surface into space
 Launcher (company), an American rocket company and launch service provider
 Launcher, a video game section of The Washington Post

See also
 Launch (disambiguation)
Launched (2000 album) hardcore punk album by Beatsteaks
 The Launching (1968 TV episode) episode of Captain Scarlet